Rabdophaga pierreana is a gall midge which forms galls on the young shoots of willow (Salix species). It was first described by Jean-Jacques Kieffer in 1909.

Description
The gall is an ovoid swelling on a young shoot, with one large chamber containing up to twenty-two red larvae. In Britain the gall is found on eared willow (Salix aurita), elsewhere it has been found on S. caprea, S. cinerea and ''S. myrsinfolia (and possibly on S.hastata). The similar looking gall, R. dubiosa has many individual chambers with a yellow or light orange larvae in each.

Distribution
Has been recorded from Belgium, France, Germany, Great Britain and Poland.

References

pierreana
Nematoceran flies of Europe
Gall-inducing insects
Insects described in 1909
Taxa named by Jean-Jacques Kieffer
Willow galls